Boomerang Bill is an extant 1922 American silent crime melodrama film produced by Cosmopolitan Productions and distributed through Paramount Pictures. Adapted from a Boston Blackie short story by Jack Boyle, it was directed by Tom Terriss and stars veteran actor Lionel Barrymore. It is preserved incomplete at the Library of Congress and George Eastman House.

Cast
Lionel Barrymore as Boomerang Bill
Marguerite Marsh as Annie
Margaret Seddon as Annie's Mother
Frank Shannon as Terrence O'Malley
Matthew Betz as Tony the Wop
Charles Fang as Chinaman
Harry Lee as Chinaman
Miriam Battista as Chinese Girl
Helen Kim as Chinese Girl

References

External links

Period newspaper clipping Boomerang Bill
Lionel Barrymore and Marguerite Marsh in a film scene (University of Washington, Sayre Collection)

1922 films
American silent feature films
Films based on short fiction
Paramount Pictures films
American crime drama films
1922 crime drama films
American black-and-white films
Melodrama films
Boston Blackie films
Films directed by Tom Terriss
1920s American films
Silent American drama films